Duetos may refer to:
Duetos (Armando Manzanero album), a 2001 album by Mexican singer Armando Manzanero
Duetos (Kumbia Kings album), a 2005 album released by A.B. Quintanilla and Los Kumbia Kings
Duetos (Renato Russo album), a 2010 album by Brazilian singer Renato Russo

See also
Duets (disambiguation); "duetos" is Portuguese and Spanish for duets